People's Food Co-op or just the People's Co-op is a food cooperative located in Portland, Oregon.  Founded in 1970 by the members of a food-buying club, the co-op is owned by over 3000 member owners and is a member of the National Cooperative Grocers Association and the United States Federation of Worker Cooperatives.

Governance and management

Board of Directors
The Board of Directors at People's consists of 5-9 members elected by the membership of the co-op.  The Board uses a modified version of consensus decision-making to reach its decisions.  In 2006, the Board adopted Policy Governance as its governance model.

Collective management
People's is managed by a non-hierarchical collective.  As of 2007, there are 27 co-managers.  Collective meetings are held once a month where co-managers make decisions regarding the co-op's operations.  Like the Board, the collective uses a modified version of consensus decision-making.  26 out of the 27 co-managers have to agree on given proposals.  The collective is divided into semi-autonomous “teams” which are responsible for reporting and heading up their various departments.  The collective is accountable to the membership via the Board.

Expansion 
In 2002, People's embarked upon an expansion project to increase its retail space.  People's secured loans from its membership and Shorebank Pacific to finance the $900,000 expansion project.   The expansion doubled the store's retail space and included an expanded Community Room as well as an elevator for wheelchair access.  The co-op's efforts won them a BEST (Businesses for an Environmentally Sustainable Tomorrow) award from the City of Portland’s Office of Sustainable Development in 2003 for energy efficiency.

Building features
The building which People's occupies incorporates a number of environmentally friendly technologies.  All of the wood used for the expansion was either salvaged or FSC certified.  The building's natural ventilation was improved by use of a solar chimney.

Green roofs

People's added two green roofs to its building during its expansion.  Drought-tolerant plant species were chosen for the green roofs.  Due to the stormwater management benefits, People's received a $2,500 grant from the Community Watershed Stewardship Program.

Cob
Cob, a mixture of earth, sand and straw, was used as infill for two walls of the building as well as for benches inside and outside of the store.  People's was the first commercially zoned building in North America to build with cob wall infill.

Geothermal
The co-op is heated and cooled by use of a geothermal exchange heat pump which includes a series of tubes coursing water through the store's floor.  This system, in conjunction with other design strategies, has reduced the heating and cooling energy consumption at the co-op by approximately 40%.

People's farmers' market 
People's hosts a year round farmers market in its courtyard on Wednesday afternoons.  In the summer months, there are typically 15-20 vendors offering a variety of locally grown and produced goods.

Philosophy and buying guidelines
People's has adopted a model of ethical consumerism and adheres to strict guidelines for the products that are retailed as well as its practices. By vote of the membership, the co-op does not carry any products containing meat with the exception of pet food. The Board of Directors has approved product selection guidelines which prohibit products containing artificial colors, flavoring, or preservatives.  The guidelines also allow for the exclusion of products from companies that test on animals or operate in contradiction to the co-op's mission.

People's composts all of its vegetable waste off site at the 47th Avenue Farm in Portland via an industrial vermicomposting bin.

People's maintains connections to the cooperative movement via its membership in regional and national cooperative federations. People's is currently a member of the National Cooperative Grocers Association, the United States Federation of Worker Cooperatives, and the Portland Alliance of Worker Cooperatives.

People's community room
People's has a meeting space on site used for public and private events.  Free yoga classes for members are held in the room. The room is also used for capoeira and t'ai chi, as well as for meetings of both the membership and Board of Directors. A lift was built during the expansion to ensure accessibility to the space.

IS4C
In 2006, People's began using IS4C, a Point of Sale (PoS) System.  The program was developed by Tak Tang of the Wedge Community Co-op in Minneapolis, Minnesota.   People's ported the IS4C software to the Linux platform, making it the only open-source software made specifically for food cooperatives.

See also
 List of food cooperatives
 Food co-op

References

External links
 Official Website
 People's Expansion - Portland Office of Sustainable Development
 U.S Department of Energy: Buildings Database

Food markets in the United States
Food cooperatives in the United States
Consumers' cooperatives in the United States
Organic farming organizations
Companies based in Portland, Oregon
Food and drink companies established in 1970
Retail companies established in 1970
1970 establishments in Oregon
Supermarkets of the United States